Vat Yellow 1 is a vat dye, yellow in appearance under some conditions used in cloth dyeing. Its synonyms are flavanthrone and Indofast Yellow, and it is in the class of anthraquinone-type compounds.

References 

Anthraquinone dyes
Vat dyes
Nitrogen heterocycles